Pertile is the family name of:

Aureliano Pertile (1885-1952), Italian opera singer
Ivo Pertile (born 1971), Italian ski jumper
Elda Pértile (born 1953), Argentine politician
Javier Pértile (born 1968),  Argentine-Italian rugby union player
Lino Pertile (born 1940), Italian linguist and professor
Merle Pertile (1941-1997), American model and actress
Ruggero Pertile (born 1974), Italian long-distance runner

Italian-language surnames

it:Pertile